Huzur Assembly constituency is one of the 230 assembly constituencies of Madhya Pradesh. It comes under Bhopal district.

Members of Legislative Assembly

References

Assembly constituencies of Madhya Pradesh
Bhopal district